Kyrgyzstan competed at the 2016 Winter Youth Olympics in Lillehammer, Norway from 12 to 21 February 2016. The Kyrgyz team consisted of one athlete in one sport.

Competitors

Biathlon

Kyrgyzstan qualified one girl.

Girls

See also
Kyrgyzstan at the 2016 Summer Olympics

References

Nations at the 2016 Winter Youth Olympics
Kyrgyzstan at the Youth Olympics
2016 in Kyrgyzstani sport